Jeremy Dan Fish (born 1974) is an American illustrator and artist. He lives and works in the North Beach neighborhood of San Francisco.

Early life and education
Fish was born in Albany, New York. He lived in upstate New York in Saratoga Springs, until he moved to San Francisco in 1994 to attend art school. He received his BFA degree in Interdisciplinary Studies from the San Francisco Art Institute (SFAI) in 1997. After graduating he took a job screen printing for the skateboard industry.

Work 
In 2006, Nike Skateboarding released a version of the Air Classic shoe with artwork designed by Fish which they later recalled because Nike was not satisfied with the embossing.

Fish has collaborated with Aesop Rock since the latter's move to San Francisco in 2005. In the fall of 2006, the pair created a book entitled The Next Best Thing, which also included a 7-inch picture disk. Fish later created the artwork for Aesop Rock's fifth studio album None Shall Pass, released by Definitive Jux. In 2009, they again teamed up to release Ghosts of the Barbary Coast on Definitive Jux.

In 2008, DRAGO staged Rome-antic Delusions, an exhibition of Fish's paintings, drawings and screen prints. The exhibition was held in Rome, and much of the art was created there as well.

His Silly Pink Bunnies (2011) sculpture and mural was at the corner of Haight Street and Laguna Street in San Francisco, featuring a large, pink rabbit head widely opening its mouth to reveal a skull. Silly Pink Bunnies was removed in 2013 due to construction. A Kickstarter crowdfunding campaign was started and raised over $50,000 to erect a permanent bronze bunny near the same location in the future.

In 2013 he worked on creating a custom pinball machine for a project called "Bring Back The Arcade" with Tilt Warning Customs.

In 2015, Fish was named San Francisco City Hall’s first Artist-in Residence and an opening O Glorious City was held in November 2015. Additionally an exhibition book of his work, "O Glorious City: A Love Letter to San Francisco" was published.

Personal life 
Much of Fish's work has been conducted on a barter system. Exchanging artwork and murals for meals at restaurants and for an art studio, but remaining adaptive and moving his art studio based on the building vacancy. He has lived in many alternative spaces to save money, including in a closet.

In late 2014, Fish suffered a brain aneurysm that required surgery.

He was previously married to artist, Jayde Fish (née Cardinalli). The couple divorced in 2019 in Los Angeles, California.

Publications

References

External links 
Jeremy Fish Official Website
Article & Video Interview: How Artist Jeremy Fish Ended Up In A San Francisco City Hall Storage Closet from NBC in 2015
Fish Studio Visit at Fecal Face from 2007
Fish Podcast Interview at Fecal Face from 2007
Fish Interview on Crown Dozen from 2007

American illustrators
San Francisco Art Institute alumni
Artists from San Francisco
1974 births
Living people